Carinodrillia cymatoides is an extinct species of sea snail, a marine gastropod mollusk in the family Pseudomelatomidae, the turrids and allies.

J. Gardner was of the opinion that this species was a possible precursor of Compsodrillia eucosmia (W.H. Dall, 1889), a Recent species that she thought belonging to Carinodrillia.

Description
The length of the shell attains 16 mm, its diameter 5.5 mm.

Distribution
This extinct species occurs in Miocene strata of the Alum Bluff Formation, Florida, USA.

References

External links
 Worldwide Mollusc Species Data Base : Carinodrillia cymatoides

cymatoides
Gastropods described in 1938